Diasello or Diaselo (Greek: Διάσελλο or Διάσελο) may refer to several places in Greece:

Diaselo, Achaea, a village in Achaea
Diasello, a village near Thermo in Aetolia-Acarnania 
Diasello, a village near Nafpaktos in Aetolia-Acarnania 
Diasello, Arta, a settlement in the Arta regional unit
Diasello, Trikala, a village in Farkadona